The Internationalist was a magazine based in Seattle, Washington.

Founded in July 2004, The Internationalist grew its readership to 65,000 nationally. In 2006, the publication was awarded a Bronze Eddie Award for editorial excellence. In the fall of 2006, The Internationalist discontinued its print edition to focus exclusively online. In June 2007 the magazine shut down all operations.

In September 2006, the magazine was profiled in the Seattle Post-Intelligencer.

References

2004 establishments in Washington (state)
2006 disestablishments in Washington (state)
Defunct political magazines published in the United States
Magazines established in 2004
Magazines disestablished in 2006
Magazines published in Seattle
Online magazines published in the United States